Święciechowa is a village in Leszno County, Greater Poland Voivodeship, in west-central Poland. It is the seat of the gmina (administrative district) called Gmina Święciechowa.

The village has a population of 2,640.

History 
During World War II, on 2 September 1939 at around 19:00, the ethnic Germans of Święciechowa carrying Nazi flags were mistaken by Polish soldiers for the Wehrmacht. As a result, a gunfire incident occurred in this village. The Polish forces eventually succeeded in stopping the revolt.

On 4 September 1939, Święciechowa succumbed to German occupation after the retreat of Polish soldiers in the area of Leszno.

References

Villages in Leszno County